France Bleu Loire Océan is a general public radio station which is part of the Radio France group.
The station is based in Nantes and covers Loire-Atlantique, Vendée and part of Maine-et-Loire.

History 
Created in 1985 under the name "Radio France Loire Océan"  and taking advantage of the vacant frequency previously occupied by private station Convergence-FM, it is run by Christiane Chadal, and took its current name in 2000. Radio France Loire Océan, banned by the CNCL, is famous throughout the region for its overpowered transmitter and the media profile of its founder Thierry Allio, known as Alain Delmas.

In 2000, under the "Plan Bleu", creating the France Bleu network, it took the name "France Bleu Loire Océan".

Local managers 
 Director : Fabienne Bureau
 Editor in chief : Pascal Roche
 Head of programming : Jean-Marie Gauthier
 Technical director : Stéphane Martin

Broadcasts 
The station broadcasts its programming via FM, to the following locations: Châteaubriant, Guémené-Penfao, La Roche-sur-Yon, Les Sables-d'Olonne, Luçon, Nantes, Saint-Nazaire, Angers and Île de Noirmoutier.

Notes and references

External links 
 

Radio France
Radio stations established in 1985
Radio stations established in 2000
1985 establishments in France